Casino Life 2: Brown Bag Legend is the nineteenth mixtape by American recording artist French Montana. It was released on May 8, 2015. The mixtape features guest appearances from Lil Wayne, Chris Brown, Lil Durk, Curren$y, will.i.am, Migos, and others. Production was handled by Detail, Young Chop, Southside, DJ Spinz, TM88, Swizz Beats and others. It is the sequel to, Mister 16: Casino Life mixtape released in 2011. On May 3, Montana announced that the song, "I Ain't Gonna Lie", which featured Lil Wayne was going to be released on the mixtape.

Track listing

References

External links
Casino Life 2: Brown Bag Legend at Discogs

2015 mixtape albums
French Montana albums
Sequel albums
Albums produced by Young Chop
Albums produced by Cool & Dre
Albums produced by Swizz Beatz
Albums produced by Detail (record producer)
Albums produced by TM88
Albums produced by Southside (record producer)